Janne Pälve (born October 8, 1992) is a Finnish professional ice hockey defenceman who is currently playing for Mörrums GoIS IK of the Hockeyettan, the third-tier league in Sweden.

Pälve began his career with his hometown team Kärpät, playing in their various junior teams at Jr. C, Jr. B and Jr. A level, though he never managed to play for Kärpät's senior team and to date has never played in the Liiga.

Instead, Pälve played 258 games in Finland's second-tier league the Mestis, from 2013 to 2018. He played for TUTO Hockey, Hokki, KeuPa HT, IPK and Hermes.

Awards and honours

References

External links

1992 births
Living people
Finnish ice hockey defencemen
Hokki players
Iisalmen Peli-Karhut players
KeuPa HT players
Kokkolan Hermes players
Sportspeople from Oulu
TuTo players